Jupiter One was an American indie rock band from Brooklyn, New York, formed in 2003. Inspired by a wide range of influences, they create upbeat indie pop songs, with a grounding in futuristic-sounding new wave-style synth sounds. Their self-titled and self-released debut album was distributed by Cordless Recordings in 2007, following another release of the album in 2008 under the Cordless Recordings label. The album Sunshower followed in 2009.

Band history
Kaoru Ishibashi and Zac Colwell are the founding members of the group. Other members are K's wife Mocha, a Japanese-born keyboardist and violinist, drummer Dave Heilman, and bassist Pat "Panda" Dougherty. K also performs in of Montreal, Regina Spektor's touring band, and a solo project, Kishi Bashi.

Ishibashi and Colwell first met while travelling musicians in the orchestra of Barnum's Kaleidoscape. After the circus tour ended they spent time in Zac's hometown of Austin before moving to New York in 2003, where Jupiter One would officially form. In New York, Ishibashi re-connected with then-girlfriend Mocha, a Japanese-born keyboardist and fellow violinist who also joined the group. Drummer Dave Heilman and bassist Pat "Panda" Dougherty later joined the band.

The band is named after the spaceship in the '60s television show Lost in Space.

Releases and performances
Many of their tracks have been used in Electronic Arts video games. "Countdown" has been featured in Madden NFL 08, while "Turn Up the Radio" featured in NHL 08, "Fire Away" featured in Burnout Paradise, and "Unglued" featured in FIFA 08. The track "Platform Moon" was used in a commercial for Mazda cars outside of the US and in FIFA 09.

In 2008 their track "Countdown" was played during the pre-episode of Heroes Season 3 on NBC, and Kyle XY season 2 on ABC. It was also featured in commercials for Payless and MLB Network.

They opened for Regina Spektor on her 2009 North American tour. They also opened for Spektor on her 2010 Australasian tour.

Third studio album and side projects
The band has been working on many separate projects since the release of Sunshower. In late 2011, the band got together to talk about some new ideas for their third studio album. Though many good ideas were thrown around, other current projects would halt any work on this album until at least late 2012. K Ishibashi started a solo project known as Kishi Bashi. He has put out a solo EP called Room For Dream in mid-2011 and then in 2012, released his first LP called 151a on the Joyful Noise label. His second album Lighght followed in 2014. Dave, Zac and Panda also formed a side project called Fancy Colors. They released their debut album Near Equator in September 2012, and their sophomore LP Island of the Dead in June 2014. In 2014, Ishibashi was interviewed by Roy Wallace and Zeke Fritts at the House of Blues in Dallas, Texas, commenting that Jupiter One, "was in the past."

Discography

Albums
 Jupiter One EP (2005)
 Magical Mountain and the Floating Hospital (Limited edition self-release) (2006)
 Jupiter One (2007) (Limited edition self-release)
 Jupiter One (2008)
 The Remix EP (2008)
 Sunshower (2009)

Singles
 "Countdown"/"Wrong Line"/"Turn Up the Radio" (promo single) (2006)
 "Flaming Arrow" (2009)

Members
 Kishi Bashi – vocals, guitar, keyboards, violin
 Zac Colwell – vocals, guitar, keyboards, flute
 Mocha – vocals, keyboards, violin
 David Heilman – drums
 Pat "Panda" Dougherty - bass

Former members
 Mark Guiliana – drums
 Neal Persiani – bass
 Ben Wright – bass

References

External links
Official site

2003 establishments in New York City
American new wave musical groups
Indie rock musical groups from New York (state)
Cordless Recordings artists
Musical groups established in 2003
Musical groups from Brooklyn
Musical quintets